The South African Bridge Federation (SABF) is the national governing body, custodian and regulator for the card game of bridge in South Africa. SABF is affiliated to the world governing body World Bridge Federation (WBF), the regional continental body African Bridge Federation (ABF), and SASCOC.

SABF organises national competitions such as the South African Bridge Congress, and the SABF Interclub. SABF sends representative men's, open, seniors (over 60) and women's teams to compete at international competitions such as African Bridge Championships, Bermuda Bowl,  Venice Cup (women) and d'Orsi Bowl (seniors).

History
South African Bridge Federation (SABF) was established in 1954, while its affiliation to World Bridge Federation (WBF) was achieved in 1960. In 1984, an attempt to expel SABF from international events and the WBF due to the apartheid policies of the South African government was averted when the SABF agreed not to send teams to competitions unless invited.

See also
 Sport in South Africa
 List of contract bridge governing bodies
 List of bridge competitions and awards

References

External links
 Official Website
 WBF Official Website

Bridge
Contract bridge governing bodies
Sports organizations established in 1954
1954 establishments in South Africa